is a Japanese actress. She has played numerous roles in film and television, including lead roles in Snakes and Earrings, Yurigokoro, and the NHK asadora Hanako to Anne.

Career
At age 16, her first year of high school, Yoshitaka joined the entertainment industry when she was scouted by an agency while shopping at Harajuku. Yoshitaka made her acting debut in 2006. She was given the lead role in the live-action adaptation of Hitomi Kanehara's award-winning novel Snakes and Earrings in 2007. Portraying Lui, a teenager whose life goes into a downward spiral after meeting the forked-tongued and tattooed Ama, the role was Yoshitaka's breakthrough role. The Japanese public began to take notice of her, and in a poll conducted by Oricon, Yoshitaka was the fifth promising young actress of 2009 and 2009's freshest female celebrity. In 2010, Oricon again conducted a poll on the most promising actress and she managed climb up to top the poll.

Yoshitaka began to receive more work in 2008 as she appeared in Flow's music video , was given her first lead role in the comedy drama  and took up the lead role in the film  before the theatrical release of her other lead film Snakes and Earrings.

In 2009, Yoshitaka was given the role of the suicidal Kairi Hayakawa in the romantic-comedy drama Love Shuffle. Later in the year, she portrayed  in the police drama Tokyo Dogs with Shun Oguri and Hiro Mizushima as her co-stars.

In 2010, she starred as all three sisters in a short drama series titled . It was announced on May 13, 2010 that Yoshitaka was given her first lead role in a network television drama series called , portraying a university student with an incurable illness.

She played Tae Kojima in the two-part 2011 live-action adaptation of the sci-fi and action manga Gantz. She also took the lead role in Kōji Maeda's movie Konzen Tokkyū, portraying a young woman dating multiple men in hopes of finding the right one to marry. It premiered in Spring 2011.

She hosted the 65th NHK Kōhaku Uta Gassen on New Year's Eve 2014 alongside Arashi.

Personal life
While she was preparing for her role in Snakes and Earrings, Yoshitaka was involved in a traffic accident in September 2007, and suffered a fractured jaw. She was in the intensive care unit (ICU) for five days as a result.

Filmography

TV drama

Film

Awards and nominations

References

External links

Japanese film actresses
Japanese television actresses
Actresses from Tokyo
1988 births
Living people
Asadora lead actors
21st-century Japanese actresses
Amuse Inc. talents
Taiga drama lead actors